Hildmann is a German surname. Notable people with the surname include:

Attila Hildmann (born 1981), German cookbook author
Heinrich Hildmann ( 1845–after 1918), German plantsman
Sascha Hildmann (born 1972), German football manager

German-language surnames